Russell Thornton (born 20 February 1942) is a Cherokee-American anthropologist and professor of anthropology at the University of California at Los Angeles, who is known for his studies of the population history of the indigenous peoples of the Americas.

His publications include:
 1986 We Shall Live Again: The 1870 and 1890 Ghost Dance Movements as Demographic Revitalization (Cambridge University Press). 
 1987 American Indian Holocaust and Survival (University of Oklahoma Press). 
 1990 The Cherokees: A Population History (University of Nebraska Press). 
 1998 Editor. Studying Native America: Problems and Prospects (University of Wisconsin Press). 
 2007 Co-editor with Candace S. Greene. The Year the Stars Fell: Lakota Winter Counts at the Smithsonian (University of Nebraska Press and the Smithsonian Institution).

Awards & Grants 

 College of Social Sciences Sesquicentennial Lecture, The Florida State University, 2001
 Distinguished Professorship, UCLA, 2004-present
 The Hail Lecture (with Candace Greene), Brown University, 2007

Education 
 Ph.D., Sociology, Florida State University (1968)
 Postdoctoral (Social Relations), Harvard University (1968–69)
 Postdoctoral (Demography), University of Southern California (1980)

References 

1942 births
Living people
University of California, Los Angeles faculty
Native American anthropologists
Florida State University alumni